Gus Brown is an English actor and comedian.

He is half of the double act Laurence & Gus, alongside fellow comedian and writer Laurence Howarth. Together they have made two series of comedy sketch shows for BBC Radio 4 – Laurence & Gus: Untold Stories (2004); Laurence & Gus: Men in Love (2006) and performed in 3 Edinburgh Fringe shows: A History of the World in 5 1/5 sketches in 2003, Men in Love in 2004 and Next in Line in 2006. In 2009, recording has begun for a series called Laurence & Gus: Hearts & Minds.

In 2006, he teamed up on stage with comedian Justin Edwards, playing Hilary Cox, pianist and sidekick to Edwards' comedy character Jeremy Lion.

He attended Cambridge University, where he met and performed regularly with Mitchell and Webb. He appears in their BBC sketch show That Mitchell and Webb Look.

He appears in one episode of each series of Toast of London.

References

External links

English male actors
English male comedians
Living people
Year of birth missing (living people)